Zoran Knežević (born 23 August 1949 in Osijek) is a Serbian astronomer, who has been publishing since 1982. His major scientific contributions are in the field of movement of small Solar System bodies, their proper elements and perturbations, as well as the identification and evolution of asteroid families. As of 2002, he is the director of Astronomical Observatory of Belgrade and the president of Serbian National Astronomy Committee.

Awards and honors 

Asteroid 3900 Knežević, discovered by Edward Bowell, is named after him. The official naming citation was published by the Minor Planet Center on 23 December 1988.

See also 
 
 Vincenzo Zappalà

References

External links 
 Dictionary of Minor Planet Names – (3900) Knežević, Lutz Schmadel
 Short biography, www.astronomija.co.rs 
 Zoran Knežević's home page

1949 births
20th-century astronomers
Discoverers of asteroids
Living people
Serbian astronomers